Musheerabad Assembly constituency is a constituency of Telangana Legislative Assembly, India. It is one of 15 constituencies in Capital city of Hyderabad. It is part of Secunderabad Lok Sabha constituency.

Dr. K. Laxman, president of Bharatiya Janata Party unit of Telangana has represented the constituency twice.

Extent of the constituency
The Assembly Constituency presently comprises the following neighbourhoods:

Members of Legislative Assembly 
Members of Legislative State Assembly, who represented Musheerabad.

Election results

Telangana Legislative Assembly election, 2018

Telangana Legislative Assembly election, 2014

Andhra Pradesh Legislative Assembly election, 2009

Trivia
 T.Anjaiah, former Chief Minister of Andhra Pradesh represented the constituency three times in 1962,1967 and 1972.
 N. Narsimha Reddy, first Home Minister of Telangana represented the constituency for two terms as Janata Party candidate and one time as TRS candidate.

See also
 Musheerabad
 List of constituencies of Telangana Legislative Assembly

References

Assembly constituencies of Telangana